All That Matters is the second album by the R&B group Portrait, released in 1995 on Capitol Records.

The album reached number 131 on the Billboard 200 and number 26 on the R&B albums chart.

Critical reception
The Indianapolis Star wrote: "From the whimsical, silky-smooth 'Here's a Kiss'—which opens the disc—to the sultry ballad 'Hold Me Close', the 12 tracks feature warm melodies, tight harmonies, catchy lyrics and lush arrangements."

Track listing
All songs written by Portrait except for "How Deep Is Your Love", which was written by the Bee Gees (Barry Gibb, Robin Gibb, and Maurice Gibb).

Charts

References

Portrait (group) albums
1995 albums